Princess Yeondeok (연덕궁주, 延德宮主) was a title given to the Goryeo Queen Consort or Royal Consort. Those who held this title may lived in Yeondeok Palace (연덕궁, 延德宮), they may refer to: 
Queen Wonhye (원혜왕후), the first consort who held this title. She was King Hyeonjong's 4th wife.
Queen Inye (인예왕후), the second consort who held this title. She was King Munjong's 3rd wife.
Queen Myeongui (명의왕후), the third consort who held this title. She was King Sukjong's only wife.
Queen Sundeok (순덕왕후), the fourth consort who held this title. She was King Yejong's 2nd wife.
Deposed Queen Yi (폐비 이씨), the fifth consort who held this title. She was King Injong's 1st wife.
Queen Gongye (공예왕후), the sixth consort who held this title. She was King Injong's 3rd wife. 
Queen Wondeok (원덕왕후), the seventh consort who held this title. She was King Gangjong's 2nd wife.